The Smedmore Hill Settlement is an archaeological site about  south-west of Corfe Castle, in Dorset, England. The site is a settlement and an associated field system, dating from the Iron Age and Romano-British period. It is a scheduled monument, described in the list entry as  "a rare and well preserved example of its class".

Description
The site is regarded as a settlement occupied by a group of subsistence farmers during the Romano-British period.

To the north and north-east of this are lynchets with widths , probably used for cultivation.
 
There was investigation in 1956 on the east side of the settlement, during construction of a water pipe trench. Finds included pottery of the Iron Age and Romano-British period, including Samian ware.

References

Iron Age sites in England
Scheduled monuments in Dorset
Archaeological sites in Dorset